Welcome to My Mind is the debut studio album by the American rock and roll band Hi-Fives. The album was released in 1995 by Lookout! It was nominated for a Bammy Award.

The band supported the album by opening several shows on Green Day's 1995 tour.

Critical reception

The Lawrence Journal-World deemed the album "a combination of archaic Brit-pop and ground-breaking punk." In 2012, Spin called it a "near-perfect garage-punk-pop masterpiece."

Track listing
 "Welcome to My Mind"
 "Transister Sister"
 "Seven Years"
 "Gone Gone Gone"
 "How Narvell Felt"
 "# "Moto"
 "You'll Screw the Pooch"
 "Love You Better"
 "Go Feral In Just 3 Days"
 "Angie"
 "Humping Away"
 "Let's Hear a Cheer"
 "Beauty Is the Mind"
 "Losing Sleep"
 "Out of Control"

References

External links
Welcome To My Mind (& more), by The Hi-Fives

The Hi-Fives albums
1995 albums